WMGC (810 kHz, "El Jefe") is an AM radio station broadcasting a Spanish Variety music format. Licensed to Murfreesboro, Tennessee, United States, the station is currently owned by Radio 810 Nashville, Limited.

References

External links
 

MGC
MGC
Murfreesboro, Tennessee
Radio stations established in 1979
1979 establishments in Tennessee
Mass media in Rutherford County, Tennessee